

W

W–Wal 

 
 
 
 
 
  (/)
 
 
 
 
  (/)
 
  (/)
  (//)
  (/)
 
 
  (/)
 
 
 
 
 
  (/)
  (/)
  (/)
  (/)
 
  (/)
  (//)
 
  (/)
 
 
 
 
 
 
  (/)
 
 
  (//)
 
  (/)
  (/)
 
 
 
  (/)
 
 
  (/)
 
 
  (1841)
 
 
  (/)
  (/)
 
  (/)

Wam–Was 

 
 
 
 
 
  (/)
 
 
 
  (//)
  (//)
 
 
  (/)
 
  (//)
 
  (/)
 
 
  (/, /)
  (/)
  (/)
 
 
 
 
 
 
  (//)
  (/)
  (SP-1241)
 
  (/)
 
  (/)
 
  (/)
 
 
 

Wat–Way 

 
 
 
 
 
  (/, //)
 
 
  (/)
 
 
 
 
  (//)
 
 
 
 
 
 
 
 
 
 
 
 
 
  (/)
 
  (//)
  (/)
  (/)
  (/)
 
 

We

 
  (/)
 

  (/)
 
 
 
 
 
 
 
 
  (//)
 
  (/)
 
 
 
  (/)
 
  (//)
 
 
 
 
 
 
 
 
 
 
 
 
 
 
 
 
 
 
 
 
 
 
 
 
 
 
 
 
 
 
 
 
 
 
 
 
 
 
 
 
 
 
 
 
 
 
 
 
 
 
 
 
 
 
 
 
 
 
 
 
 
 
 
 
 
 
 
 
 
 
 
 
 
 
 
 
 
 
 
  
 
 
 
  (//)
 
 

Wh

 
 
  (/)
 
  (/)
 
 
 
 
  (/, /)
  (//, /)
 
 
 
 
  (//)
  (//)
  (/)
  (/)
 
 
  (/)
 
 
 
  (//)
 
 
 
 
 
 

Wi

 
 
 
 
 
  (/, /)
 
 
 
 
 
 
  (/)
 
 
 
 
 
  (/)
 
 
  (/)
 
 
  (//)
 
 
 
  (/)
 
 
 
  (//)
 
 
 
 
 
 
 
 
 
 
 
 
 
 
 
 
 
  (/)
 
  (/)
 
 
 
 
 
  (/)
  (/)
 
 
  (/)
  
  (/)
 
 
  (/)
  (/)
 
 
  (/)
  (///)
 
 
 
  (/)
 
  (/)
  (/)
 
 
 
 
 
 
 
 
 
 
 
  (/)
 
 
  (/)
 
  (/)
 
  (/)
 
 
 
  (//)
 
  (/)
 
 
 
 
 
 
 
  (/)
  (/)
 
  (/)
 
 
 
 
 
 
 
 
 
  (/)
 

Wo

  (//)
 
 
 
  (/)
 
 
 
 
  (//)
 
  (/)
 
 
 
 
 
 
  (/)
  (/)
  (/)
  (/)
 
 
  (//)
  (//)

Wr
 
 
  (/, //)

Wy
 
 
 
  (//)
 
 
 
  (/)
  (//)

X
 
 
 
 

Y

 
 
 
  (//)
 
  (///)
  (/)
  (/)
 
 
 
 
 
 
 
 
  (/)
 
 
 
  (/)
  (//)
  (//)
  (/)
 
 
  (/)
 
  (/)
  (//)
  (//)
 
 
  (/)
 
 
 
 
 
 
 
  (/)
  (/, /)
  (/)
  (/)

Z

 
 
 
 
  (//)
  (/)
 
 
 
  (/)
  (/)
 
  (/)
 
 
 
 
 
  (/)
 
 
 
 
 
 
 
 
 
 
 
 
  (1910)
 
 
 
  (/)

External links 
 navy.mil: List of homeports and their ships
 Dictionary of American Naval Fighting Ships
  Naval Vessel Register